Wilma King (born 1942) is a historian and the Arvarh E. Strickland Distinguished Professor of History at the University of Missouri. She holds a B.A. in American history from Jackson State University, and both an M.A. and Ph.D. in Recent U.S. History from Indiana University. She came to the University of Missouri in 1999 and was the first to receive appointment to the Arvarh E. Strickland chair in Black History and Culture, established when Strickland retired.

Selected bibliography 

 Stolen Childhood: Slave Youth in Nineteenth-Century America (1995)

References 

1942 births
African-American historians
University of Missouri faculty
Indiana University alumni
Jackson State University alumni
American historians of education
Living people
American women historians
Place of birth missing (living people)
21st-century African-American people
21st-century African-American women
20th-century African-American people
20th-century African-American women
African-American women writers